Macedonian literature begins with the Ohrid Literary School in the First Bulgarian Empire (nowadays North Macedonia) in 886. These first written works in the dialects of the Old Church Slavonic were religious. The school was established by St. Clement of Ohrid.  The Macedonian recension at that time was part of the Old Church Slavonic and it did not represent one regional dialect but a generalized form of early Eastern South Slavic. The standardization of Macedonian in the 20th century provided good ground for further development of the modern Macedonian literature and this period is the richest one in the history of the literature itself.

History 
Macedonian was not officially recognized until the establishment of Macedonia as a constituent republic of communist Yugoslavia in 1945. Krste Petkov Misirkov in his Za Makedonskite raboti (1903; On the Macedonian Matters) and in the literary periodical Vardar (established 1905) helped to create the foundations of Macedonian language and literature. These efforts were continued after World War I by Kosta Racin, who wrote mainly poetry in Macedonian and propagated its use through the literary journals of the 1930s. Racin's poems in Beli mugri (1939; White Dawns), which include many elements of oral folk poetry, were prohibited by the government of pre-World War II Yugoslavia. Some writers, such as Kole Nedelkovski, worked and published abroad because of political pressure.

Periods 
The Macedonian Academy of Sciences and Arts divides Macedonian literature into three large periods, which are subdivided into additional ones. The periods of the Macedonian literature are:
 Old Macedonian literature – 9th to 18th centuries
 From introduction of the Christianity till the Turkish invasion – 9th to 14th centuries
 From Turkish invasion till the beginning of the 18th century
 New Macedonian literature – 1802 to 1944
 period of national awakening
 revolutionary period
 inter-war literary period
 Modern Macedonian literature – 1944 – today

Modern literature 
After World War II, under the new Yugoslav SR Macedonia, the scholar Blaze Koneski and others were charged with the task of standardizing Macedonian as the official literary language. With this new freedom to write and publish in its own language, SR Macedonia produced many literary figures in the postwar period. The Association of Writers of Macedonia was established in 1947. Poetry was represented in the work of Aco Šopov, Slavko Janevski, Blaze Koneski, and Gane Todorovski. Janevski was also a distinguished prose writer and the author of the first Macedonian novel, Selo zad sedumte jaseni (1952; “The Village Beyond the Seven Ash Trees”). His most ambitious work was a cycle of six novels that deals with Macedonian history and includes Tvrdoglavi (1965; “The Stubborn Ones”), a novel articulating the Macedonian people's myths and legends of remembering and interpreting their history. Prewar playwrights, such as Vasil Iljoski, continued to write, and the theatre was invigorated by new dramatists, such as Kole Cašule, Tome Arsovski, and Goran Stefanovski. Cašule also wrote several novels. A main theme of his work is the defeat of idealists and idealism. His play Crnila (1960; “Black Things”) deals with the early 20th-century murder of an IMRO leader by other Organization's activists and with the characters of both executioners and victim.

Among the best-known novelists and writers of prose were Stale Popov (Krpen zivot (1953; “Darned life”)), Gjorgji Abadžiev (Pustina (1961; “Desert”)) and Zivko Cingo, whose collections of stories Paskvelija (1962) and Nova Paskvelija (1965; “New Paskvelija”) are about an imaginary land where clashes and interactions between old traditions and revolutionary consciousness are enacted. His novel Golemata voda (1971; “The Great Water”), set in an orphanage, shows the grandness and sadness of childhood. Other notable writers include Petre M. Andreevski (Pirej (1980; “Pirej”)), Vlada Uroševic (Sonuvacot i prazninata (1979; “The Dreamer and the Emptiness”)), Jovan Pavlovski (Sok od prostata (1991; “Prostate Gland Juice”)), Venko Andonovski (Papokot na svetot (2000; “Navel of the World”)), Aleksandar Prokopiev (Covekot so cetiri casovnici (2003; “The Man With Four Watches”)), and some of the leading playwrights were Jordan Plevnes (Mazedonische zustände (1979; “Mazedonische zustände”)), Sashko Nasev (Chija si (1991; “Who do you Belong to”)), and Dejan Dukovski (Bure barut (1996; “The powder keg”)).

The diversity of themes and narrative styles among 21st-century writers has grown even more, and the list includes writers born in the period 1970s–1990s. Some of the most distinguished in this generation are: Goce Smilevski (Sestrata na Sigmund Frojd (2007; “Freud's Sister”)), Lidija Dimkovska (Rezerven zivot (2012; “A Spare Life”)), Slavcho Koviloski (Sinot na kralot (2011; “The Son of the King”)), Nikola Madzirov (Ostatoci od nekoe drugo vreme (2007; “Remnants of Another Age”)), Stefan Markovski (Anatomija na bumbarot (2020; “The Bumblebee Anatomy”)), Rumena Bužarovska (Mojot maz (2014; “My Husband”)), Petar Andonovski (Teloto vo koe mora da se zivee (2015; “The Body One Must Live In”)), Nenad Joldeski (Sekoj so svoeto ezero (2012; “Each with Their Own Lake”)), and others.

Authors 
Some of the well-known authors that contributed in the development of the Macedonian literature are:
 Krste Misirkov  – writer – writer, Slavist and philologist
 Aco Šopov – poet and writer
 Gjorgjija Pulevski – writer and political activist
 Gane Todorovski – writer and poet
 Ante Popovski – writer and poet
 Kočo Racin – writer and poet
 Kole Nedelkovski – poet
 Risto Krle  – writer
 Venko Markovski – poet
 Vlado Maleski – writer
 Vojdan Chernodrinski – writer
 Vasil Iljoski – writer
 Anton Panov – writer
 Mateja Matevski – poet
 Blaže Koneski – writer
 Simon Drakul – writer
 Gogo Ivanovski – writer
 Ivan Tochko – writer
 Petar Shirilov – writer
 Tashko Georgievski – writer
 Slavko Janevski – writer
 Živko Čingo – writer
 Grigor Prličev
More...

See also 
 Macedonian language
 History of the Macedonian language

Notes

References 
 Makedonska književnost (“Macedonian Literature”). Tome Sazdov, Vera Stojčevska-Antić, Dragi Stefanija, Georgij Stalev, Borislav Pavlovski. Školska knjiga. Zagreb, 1988. (in )

External links 
 Macedonian literature from 14 c.